{{Infobox university|
| name = Saint Mary University
| native_name =Universidad Santa María
| image= La florencia 1.jpg
| logo = Logo USM.gif
| established = 1953
| motto = "A challenge to excellence"    '''| city =  Caracas, Distrito Capital (Capital of Venezuela)
| type = Private
| rector = José Ceballos Gamardo
| country = Venezuela
| faculty =
| students = 20.000 approximately
| campus = Urban Approximately 450,000 square meters
| colors = Blue and White
| nickname = USM
| website = usm.edu.ve
}}Saint Mary University (Spanish: Universidad Santa María) (USM) is a private university in Venezuela. USM has campuses in several cities, such as Caracas (where the main campus is located), Puerto La Cruz, Barinas and Puerto Ayacucho.

The university was founded on October 13, 1953, by Lola de Fuenmayor in El Paraíso neighborhood (Southwestern Caracas). In 1983, the main campus of the university was built in La Florencia (East Caracas).

Symbols

Shield

In his inscription reads: Saint Mary University (Spanish: Universidad Santa María) founded in 1953, with the words God, Country and Home.

Flag

It is light blue with the shield engraved in the center, usually placed in the central square with the national flag.

Emblems

Saint Mary University Mascot
It was a lion named Ibrahim, and a lioness named Luna, both died. After, the Saint Mary University brought another lion called Friguela, who reigned for many years in the University. Nowadays, the University doesn't have any lion alive at the campus.

Degrees

Law college:
Law
International Studies
College of Social and Humanistic Sciences:
Social communication
Business Administration
Economics
Public Accounting
College of Engineering:
Civil Engineering
Industrial Engineering
Telecommunications Engineering
Systems Engineering
Architecture
Odontology
Pharmacy

Headquarters

Headquarter, The Florence (Spanish: La Florencia)
It is built on an area of 450,000 square meters, of which 200,000 are infrastructure including buildings (15 in total, where the various faculties and administrative offices are located), internal circulation roads and green areas. In this place all races work: Administration, Accounting, Economics, Social Communication, Law, International Studies, Pharmacy, Civil Engineering, Industrial, Systems and Telecommunications; Architecture and Odontology.Student groups, The FlorenceAt the headquarters of the Florence they are constituted multiple student teams that promote university life in the institution, among them are:
C.R.E.O: commitment, responsibility, excellence and organization. 

ConseUSM
Action Usemista
Eimun MUN School of International Studies at the Saint Mary University

USM delegationCurrently in management University Student Government the following facilities:'''

Student Center School of Law (CED USM)
Student Center School of International Studies (CEEI USM)
Student Center of the Faculty of Engineering and Architecture (CEFIA USM)
Student Center of the School of Social Communication (CECOSSMA USM)
Student Center Schools Administration and Accounting (ECAC USM)
Student Center School of Economics (EEC USM)
Student Center of the Faculty of Pharmacy (CEF USM)
Student Center of the School of Dentistry (CEO USM)

Postgraduate Headquarter

The original headquarters is located in The Paradise (Spanish:El Paraiso), keeping its historical interest was completely remodeled to become the great Center of Postgraduate Studies. Currently it is appropriate and central building, with classrooms and amphitheaters designed for these studies. Library, parking and other services that make up a set of comprehensive quality development of academic activities, where extension courses, specialization and master's degrees as well as doctorates are held. Studies in this office takes a practical, functional, innovative concept and perfectly connected to the national reality

Headquarter East-Puerto La Cruz

Among the projects decentralization in 1994 Saint Mary University is established with its own headquarters in Barcelona, Anzoategui, based on a modern building set in 28,000 square meters of land located in the intercommunal Avenue Barcelona.

This important site starts working on January 23, 1995 and has classrooms acclimated to the area design; library, also adapted to the environment, modern computer labs with sophisticated equipment and programs in different areas. It is an educational complex with ample parking, all services and modern café located in a small shopping center surrounded by green areas.

Amazon Headquarter-Puerto Ayacucho

Saint Mary University founded in 1999 in the Amazon a university nucleus where students study law, economics, accounting and business administration state. This office works in two shifts: morning and night.

The core features spacious and comfortable classrooms, library, computer lab and cafeteria whose facilities are located in a nice air-conditioned hut. The whole atmosphere is carefully adapted to the environment of the Venezuelan Amazon region and to the needs of the community. It is a great constitutional effort that contributes to family unity and cultural development of the region.

In this seat racing law, social communication, accounting, administration, pharmacy, civil engineering, industrial and systems work.

Headquarter Barinas

This core began operations in 2004 and emerged as an academic option to capture a large student population eager to train in social sciences, scientific and administrative area.

In this place students study law, Social Communication, Accounting, Civil Engineering, Industrial and Systems.

Saint Mary Firefighters

The Volunteer Fire Department University is a nonprofit organization founded on May 10, 2010, in order to create an institution within the campus to provide protection to the student and working population; while it is offering to anyone who wishes to be part of this body the opportunity to become a professional firefighter University.

Notable alumni

 Antonio Ledezma: Venezuelan Political
 Tarek Saab: Venezuelan Political
 Sthefany Gutiérrez: Miss Venezuela 2018 / 2nd Runner-up Miss Universe 2018
 Vanessa Gonçalves: Miss Venezuela 2010 / Top 16 Miss Universe 2011
 Juan Alfonso Baptista: Venezuelan Actor

Naomi Soazo: Paralympic Gold Medalist (Pekin 2008/Rio 2016)
Ángel David Revilla: Venezuelan-Argentinian Youtuber and Writer

References 

Universities and colleges in Caracas
Educational institutions established in 1953
1953 establishments in Venezuela